Hypocritanus fascipennis is a species of syrphid fly in the family Syrphidae. Until 2020, it was classified in the genus Ocyptamus.

References

Further reading

External links

 
 

Syrphini
Insects described in 1830